Krishna Tulasi is an Indian Telugu language soap opera which premiered on 22 February 2021 on Zee Telugu and streams on the digital platform ZEE5. It stars Aishwarya H and Dileep R Shetty. The series was produced by Raghavendra Rao. It is an official remake of a Zee Bangla series Krishnakoli.

Plot
Shyama is a young, dusky girl, who faces discrimination because of her skin color. However, she is talented and sets out on a journey, to create an identity for herself. She believes that her complexion is akin to Lord Krishna's complexion. Her life changes after marriage when she goes on to make a career in music.

Cast

Main
 Aishwarya H as Shyama
 Dileep Shetty as Akhil

Recurring
 Lakshmi Siddaiah as Vasantha
 JL Srinivas as Ananda Gajapati Varma
 Nakshatra as Sanjana
 Pavitranath as Mallikarjun
 Priyanka Shivanna as Aishwariya
 Teja as Govind
 Radhika Reddy as Vaidedhi
 Swathi as Shoba
 Srinivas as Ashok Varma
 Ajay as Narayana
 Aadhya as Roopa Rani 
 Sathwik as Kittu
 Prathyusha as Haripriya
 Roopa Reddy as Guruvamma
 Suhan as Arun Varma

Adaptations

References

External links
 Krishna Tulasi at ZEE5

2021 Indian television series debuts
Telugu-language television shows
Zee Telugu original programming
2022 Indian television series endings